The Escambray Mountains are a mountain range in the central region of Cuba, in the provinces of Sancti Spíritus, Cienfuegos and Villa Clara.

Overview
The Escambray range is divided into two sections by the Agabama River. The western part is called the Guamuhaya Mountains, and the eastern part, raising between Trinidad and Sancti Spiritus, is best known as Sierra de Sancti Spíritus. After Pico San Juan, the highest points are Caballete de Casas, Gavilanes, Loma de Banao, Caja de Agua, and Pico Tuerto.

Topes de Collantes is a nature reserve park established in the south-eastern ranges of Escambray Mountains, protecting and showcasing caves, rivers, waterfalls, and canyons. The Valley de los Ingenios is developed at the south-eastern foot of the mountains, and is a UNESCO World Heritage Site.

The mountains were the theater of the Escambray Rebellion in 1959–1965. It was also a planned refuge during the Bay of Pigs Invasion, however, it was never used as such.

Gallery

See also
 Geography of Cuba

References

External links

Mountain ranges of Cuba
Geography of Cienfuegos Province
Geography of Villa Clara Province
Geography of Sancti Spíritus Province